Hexadecane (also called cetane) is an alkane hydrocarbon with the chemical formula C16H34.  Hexadecane consists of a chain of 16 carbon atoms, with three hydrogen atoms bonded to the two end carbon atoms, and two hydrogens bonded to each of the 14 other carbon atoms.

Cetane number

Cetane is often used as a shorthand for cetane number, a measure of the combustion of diesel fuel. Cetane ignites very easily under compression; for this reason, it is assigned a cetane number of 100, and serves as a reference for other fuel mixtures.

Hexadecyl radical

Hexadecyl is an alkyl radical of carbon and hydrogen derived from hexadecane, with formula C16H33 and with mass 225.433, occurring especially in cetyl alcohol. It confers strong hydrophobicity on molecules containing it. Carboplatin modified with hexadecyl and polyethylene glycol has increased liposolubility and PEGylation, proposed to useful in chemotherapy, specifically non-small-cell lung cancer.

Hexadecyl was used from 1982 for radiolabelling, and this continues to be useful, for example for radiolabelling exosomes and hydrogels,
and for positron emission tomography.

Hexadecyl platelet-activating factor has profound effects on the lung, and hexadecyl glyceryl ether participates in the biosynthesis of plasmalogens.

See also
Cetane index
Isocetane
Higher alkanes

References

Cited sources

External links
 Vapor pressure  and liquid density calculation
 Technique to determine hexadecane transfer

Alkanes